Sir Langer Meade Loftus Owen (27 August 1862 – 25 January 1935) was an Australian lawyer and judge.

Life
Owen was a son of Sir William Owen, Senior Puisne Judge of the New South Wales Supreme Court.
He was educated at New School, Darlinghurst, Charterhouse School, England, and New College, Oxford. He was appointed KC in February 1906.

During the war years (1914–1918), he was an untiring worker for the Red Cross and was awarded a CBE in 1918 for his service.

He was appointed to the Supreme Court Bench in 1922, and presided over many important divorce suits, notably the Field case, which lasted 89 days, with costs amounting to around £40,000; many millions in today's currency.

He retired in June 1932, and then served as chairman of the Australian Performing Rights Association. He was appointed Knight Bachelor in 1934.

Sir Langer Owen was noted for his unfailing courtesy, and was a stickler for public morality; he acted as president of the Bribery and Secret Commissions Prevention League.

Death
He died after a prolonged illness, aged 72, on 25 January 1935). His remains were cremated.

Family
Owen married Mary Louisa Dames Longworth on 5 September 1888; she died around 1916.
Sir William Francis Langer Owen, KBE, QC (1899–1972) was a son.

Owen married again on 25 August 1925, to Hilda Margaret Chapman, a daughter of Sir Frederick Chapman of Wellington, New Zealand and granddaughter of Henry Samuel Chapman.

References 

1862 births
1935 deaths
19th-century Australian judges
20th-century Australian judges
People educated at Charterhouse School
Alumni of New College, Oxford
Australian Knights Bachelor